Daniel Popovic (born 1 March 1986) is an Australian professional golfer.

Popovic began playing on the PGA Tour of Australasia in 2012 and won the final event of the season, the Australian PGA Championship.

Professional wins (1)

PGA Tour of Australasia wins (1)

1Co-sanctioned by the OneAsia Tour

Results in World Golf Championships

"T" = Tied

References

External links

Australian male golfers
PGA Tour of Australasia golfers
Golfers from Melbourne
1986 births
Living people